North Shewa Zone may refer to:

North Shewa Zone (Amhara), Amhara Region, Ethiopia  
North Shewa Zone (Oromia), Oromia Region, Ethiopia